This is a list of medals won by participants representing Canada at the 2007 Pan American Games.

Medals

Gold

Men's 400 m hurdles: Adam Kunkel
Men's hammer throw: James Steacy
Men's shot put: Dylan Armstrong
Women's 800 metres: Diane Cummins
Women's 5000 metres: Megan Metcalfe
Women's heptathlon: Jessica Zelinka

Men's singles: Mike Beres
Men's doubles: Mike Beres and William Milroy

Men's K-1 1000 m: Angus Mortimer
Women's K-2 500 m: Kia Byers and Marie-Christine Schmidt
Women's K-1 500 m: Jillian D'Alessio

Women's time trial: Anne Samplonius
Women's mountain-biking: Catharine Pendrel

Men's 3 m springboard: Alexandre Despatie 
Women's 10 m platform synchronized: Émilie Heymans and Marie-Ève Marleau

Individual jumping: Jill Henselwood

Men's individual sabre: Philippe Beaudry

Men's tournament: Canada national field hockey team
Ranjeev Deol, Wayne Fernandes, Connor Grimes, Ravi Kahlon, Bindi Kullar, Mike Mahood, Matt Peck, Ken Pereira, Scott Sandison, Marian Schole, Peter Short, Rob Short, Gabbar Singh, Scott Tupper, Paul Wettlaufer and Anthony Wright

Women's rhythmic gymnastics clubs: Alexandra Orlando
Women's rhythmic gymnastics rope: Alexandra Orlando
Women's rhythmic gymnastics hoop: Alexandra Orlando

Women's individual trampoline: Karen Cockburn

Men's 70 kg: Saeed Baghbani

Men's lightweight coxless fours: Adam Reynolds, Andrew Borden, John Haver and Paul Amesbury
Women's quadruple sculls: Nathalie Maurer, Zoe Hoskins, Peggy Hyslop and Cristin McCarty
Men's pair: Chris Jarvis and Dan Casaca

Women's RS:X: Dominique Vallee

Women's trap: Susan Nattrass
Women's 10 m air pistol: Avianna Chao

Women's team event: Alana Miller, Runa Reta and Carolyn Russell

Men's 100 m breaststroke: Scott Dickens

Women's welterweight: Karine Sergerie

Men's tricks: Jaret Llewellyn
Men's jumps: Jaret Llewellyn
Men's slalom: Drew Ross
Women's tricks: Whitney McClintock
Women's slalom: Whitney McClintock

Men's freestyle 84 kg: Roozbah Banihashemi
Women's freestyle 48 kg: Carol Huynh

Silver

Women's team competition: Marie-Pier Baudet, Kristen Niles and Kateri Vrakking
Men's team competition: Crispin Duenas, Jason Lyon and Hugh MacDonald

Men's 4 × 100 m relay: Anson Henry, Richard Adu-Bobie, Jared Connaughton and Bryan Barnett
Men's 400 metres: Tyler Christopher
Women's high jump: Nicole Forrester
Women's 100 m hurdles: Perdita Felicien

Women's singles competition: Charmaine Reed
Women's doubles competition: Fiona McKee and Charmaine Reed
Mixed competition: Mike Beres and Val Loker

Men's K-1 500 m: Angus Mortimer
Men's K-4 1000 m: Angus Mortimer, Jeremy Bordeleau, Mark de Jonge and Chris Pellini

Men's keirin: Cam MacKinnon

Men's individual trampoline: Jason Burnett
Women's individual trampoline: Rosannagh MacLennan

Team jumping: Mac Cone, Karen Cudmore, Jill Henselwood, Eric Lamaze and Ian Millar
Team eventing: Kyle Carter, Sandra Donnelly, Mike Winter and Waylon Roberts
Team dressage: Andrea Bresee, Diane Creech, Tom Dvorak and Karen Pavicic

Men's sabre team competition: Michel Boulos, Philippe Beaudry and Nicolas Mayer
Women's individual épée: Julie Leprohon
Women's sabre team competition: Olga Ovtchinnikova, Sandra Sassine and Julie Cloutier
Women's foil team competition: Louise-Hélène Bouchard, Monica Kwan and Élise Daoust

Men's half-heavyweight (−100 kg): Keith Morgan

Women's individual competition: Monica Pinette

Women's double sculls: Peggy Hyslop and Cristin McCarty
Women's pair: Zoe Hoskins and Nathalie Maurer

Men's team competition: Shahier Razik, Shawn DeLierre and Robin Clarke
Women's singles competition: Alana Miller

Women's 200 m freestyle: Stephanie Horner 
Women's 100 m breaststroke: Annamay Pierse 
Women's 200 m breaststroke: Annamay Pierse 
Women's 4 × 100 m freestyle: Elizabeth Collins, Seanna Mitchell, Chanelle Charron-Watson and Hilary Bell
Women's 4 × 200 m freestyle: Chanelle Charron-Watson, Elizabeth Collins, Hilary Bell and Stephanie Horner
Women's 4 × 100 m medley: Elizabeth Wycliffe, Annamay Pierse, Stephanie Horner and Chanelle Charron-Watson

Women's duet: Marie-Pier Boudreau Gagnon and Isabelle Rampling
Women's team competition: Marie-Pier Boudreau Gagnon, Jessika Dubuc, Marie-Pierre Gagné, Dominika Kopcik, Ève Lamoureux, Tracy Little, Élise Marcotte, Isabelle Rampling and Jennifer Song

Women's tournament: Canada women's national softball team

Women's team competition: Chris Xu, Mo Zhang and Judy Long

Women's featherweight (−57 kg): Shannon Condie

Men's individual competition: Brent McMahon

Women's tournament: Canada women's national water polo team
Krystina Alogbo, Joëlle Békhazi, Alison Braden, Cora Campbell, Tara Campbell, Emily Csikos, Whynter Lamarre, Sandra Lizé, Dominique Perreault, Marina Radu, Rachel Riddell, Christine Robinson and Rosanna Tomiuk

Men's jumps: Ryan Dodd
Men's wakeboard: Brad Buskas
Women's jumps: Whitney McClintock

Women's 63 kg: Christine Girard

Women's freestyle 72 kg: Ohenewa Akuffo

Bronze

Women's singles competition: Sarah MacMaster

Men's 10 m platform: Alexandre Despatie 
Men's 3 m springboard synchronized: Alexandre Despatie and Arturo Miranda
Women's 3 m springboard synchronized: Meaghan Benfeito and Kelly MacDonald

Women's tournament: Canada women's national soccer team
Sasha Andrews, Melanie Booth, Candace Chapman, Martina Franko, Randee Hermuss, Kristina Kiss, Kara Lang, Karina LeBlanc, Diana Matheson, Andrea Neil, Christine Sinclair, Taryn Swiatek, Melissa Tancredi, Katie Thorlakson, Brittany Timko, Amy Vermeulen, Amy Walsh and Rhian Wilkinson

Men's 200 m freestyle: Adam Sioui 
Men's 1500 m freestyle: Kier Maitland
Men's 100 m breaststroke: Mathieu Bois
Men's 400 m individual medley: Keith Beavers
Men's 4 × 200 m freestyle: Chad Hankewich, Stefan Hirniak, Pascal Wollach and Adam Sioui
Men's 4 × 100 m medley: Matthew Hawes, Scott Dickens, Joe Bartoch and Adam Sioui
Women's 800 m freestyle: Savannah King 
Women's 100 m backstroke: Elizabeth Wycliffe 
Women's 200 m backstroke: Elizabeth Wycliffe 
Women's 200 m individual medley: Stephanie Horner 
Women's 10 km open water: Tanya Hunks

Men's tournament: Canada men's national water polo team
Aaron Feltham, Kevin Graham, Brandon Jung, Con Kudaba, Thomas Marks, Nathaniel Miller, Noah Miller, Kevin Mitchell, Robin Randall, Andrew Robinson, Jean Sayegh, Daniel Stein and Nic Youngblud

Results by event

Basketball

Men's tournament
Preliminary round (group A)
Lost to Puerto Rico (63–82)
Lost to Brazil (63–98)
Lost to US Virgin Islands (67–74)
Classification round
5th/8th place: Lost to Panama (67–68)
7th/8th place: Defeated US Virgin Islands (69–60) → 7th place
Team roster
Osvaldo Jeanty
Jermaine Anderson
Ryan Bell
Paul Larmand
Sheray Thomas 
Rans Brempong
Andy Rautins
Aaron Doornekamp
Jesse Wade Young
Jermaine Bucknor
Sean Denison
Vlad Kuljanin
Head coach: Leo Rautins

Women's tournament
Preliminary round (group A)
Defeated Mexico (74–63)
Defeated Jamaica (58–46)
Lost to Brazil (63–77)
Semi-finals
Lost to United States (59–75)
Bronze medal match
Lost to Cuba (49–62) → 4th place
Team roster
Jordan Adams
Kelsey Adrian
Uzo Asagawara
Chelsea Aubry
Amanda Brown
Devon Campbell
Sarah Crooks
Gabriele Kleindienst
Lizanne Murphy
Tamara Tatham
Sheila Townsend
Carrie Watson 
Head coach: Alison McNeill

Triathlon

Men's competition
Brent McMahon
 1:52:38.19 — Silver medal
Kyle Jones
 1:53:05.25 — 4th place
Paul Tichelaar
 1:54:03.16 — 11th place

Women's competition
Lauren Groves
 1:59:50.38 — Bronze medal
Kathy Tremblay
 2:00:25.90 — 4th place

Volleyball

Men's tournament
Preliminary round (group A)
Lost to Brazil (0–3)
Defeated Mexico (3–1)
Lost to Cuba (0–3)
Classification round
5th/8th place: Lost to Argentina (2–3)
7th/8th place: Defeated Mexico (3–0) → 7th place
Team roster
Christian Bernier
Daniel Lewis
Michael Munday
Jeremy Wilcox
Dallas Soonias
Paul Duerden
Brett Youngberg
Chris Wolfenden
Murray Grapentine (c)
Frederic Winters
Leo Carroll 
Nicholas Cundy
Head coach: Glenn Hoag

See also
Canada at the 2006 Commonwealth Games
Canada at the 2008 Summer Olympics

References
Canadian Medallists at Olympic.ca

Nations at the 2007 Pan American Games
P
2007